Scuba may refer to:
 Scuba diving
 Scuba set, the equipment used for scuba (Self-Contained Underwater Breathing Apparatus) diving
 Scuba, an in-memory database developed by Facebook
 Submillimetre Common-User Bolometer Array, either of two instruments used on the James Clerk Maxwell Telescope
 Scuba (musician)
 Scuba (P-Model album)

See also
 Scooba (disambiguation)